Gardening, Not Architecture is an American electronic music project created by Sarah Saturday and based in Nashville, Tennessee.

History

Formation (2003-2004)

Sarah recorded original demos that would become songs on 'First EP' before relocating to Los Angeles after the break-up of her pop-punk band, Saving Face. Demos were recorded in producer Beau Sorenson's apartment in Madison, Wisconsin, but never released.

First EP (2007-2009)
Sarah returned to Madison in 2007 to begin recording four songs for the 'First EP' with producer/engineer Beau Sorenson at Smart Studios. 

The EP was released in the fall of 2007 and included four songs 'If You Only Knew', 'Jabberwocky', 'Nevermind', and 'The Great Unraveling'.

In 2008, Sarah recruited Hunter Burgan to play drums with her for the first-ever Gardening, Not Architecture shows in Los Angeles.

On March 10, 2009, the band's first-ever tour launched in North Hollywood, California. The three-week tour was sponsored by Macbeth Shoes and included shows in Santa Barbara, Sacramento, Portland, Seattle, Salt Lake City and beyond.

On April 3, 2009, Sarah released the official music video for 'If You Only Knew' directed by Evan Glodell.

First LP (2009-2010)
In the summer of 2009, Sarah began recording the first full-length album with producer Beau Sorenson at Albert Court Studios in Portland, OR. The 'First LP' was released on September 8, 2009.

On September 9, 2009, Gardening, Not Architecture launched a six-week U.S. tour alongside Gavin Castleton.

On September 28, 2009, the official music video for 'Stop, I Get It' was released.

In 2010, Gardening, Not Architecture joined Crazy Diamond for a two-week tour of Canada before taking part in the entire Vans Warped Tour for shows from June 24 through August 15. A U.S. fall tour from October 1 through November 27 then followed, including performances at Indie Week in Toronto, CMJ Music Festival in New York City and the Halifax Pop Explosion Festival.

Saboteur (2011)
In 2011, Sarah moved from Los Angeles to Seattle and began writing songs for a second full-length album while launching a Kickstarter campaign to fund the recording.

'Saboteur' was released on November 22, 2011. A fall tour with Chris Staples followed the release from November 25 - December 10.

The Florida Sessions (2012)
In 2012, Sarah released a series of demos recorded in isolation in Northwest Florida over the course of two weeks called 'The Florida Sessions', released for free online via Bandcamp. Later that year, Sarah relocated to East Nashville, Tennessee.

Fossils (2013-2015)
Sarah began writing songs for a third full-length album in 2013, along with assembling a new live band with Bryan Feece on drums and Jackson Parsons on guitar.

In October 2014, Sarah entered Big Light Studios in Nashville with engineer Logan Matheny to begin work on the new full-length album to be released in spring 2015. The album was completed on May 24, 2015, and released on July 10, 2015.

Fossils Film (2015-2016)  
For Gardening, Not Architecture's third album, Sarah Saturday decided that instead of doing traditional music videos she wanted a feature-length film to pair with the album. Saturday was adamant about doing something where she was not the focal point and put out a post on a listserv reaching out to the Nashville filmmaking community.  Saturday received recommendations to contact Dycee Wildman. The two met and formed the idea to section the album into thirds and have three short films together creating an anthology film, each part with their own director and treatment. Wildman introduced Saturday to Jennifer Bonior, who stepped into the role of Producer on the film. Shortly after, Saturday brought on Jonathan Rogers and Motke Dapp to direct the other two-thirds of the film.

On April 25, 2015, filming began for the Fossils feature film. The film's three parts are: A Delicate Decay directed by Motke Dapp, Of Imprints directed by Jonathan Rogers, and And What Remains directed by Dycee Wildman. Each part has its own storyline, however, the films are connected by a central theme and imagery. The most prevalent images seen throughout the film are: water, yellow flowers, clouds, and a series of dance movement choreographed by Nashville choreographer Rachel Tolbert. The cloud imagery was brought to life by Nashville artist L.A. Bachman, who was commissioned to paint her Cloud series for the film. This series of paintings was hung at The Rymer Gallery in Nashville on June 27, 2015, as part of the Fossils Fundraiser Gala and remained on exhibit through the end of July 2015. A selection of these paintings can be seen throughout the entire film.

Fossils screened privately in East Nashville, Tennessee, to an invite-only audience of approximately 200 people at The Crying Wolf on July 11, 2015, as part of the Fossils album release party.

A Delicate Decay directed by Motke Dapp
Part One of Fossils consists of the first three songs on the album: Stay the Course, Hunting, and The Light. A Delicate Decay revolves around a girl taking a bath and reflecting on her past relationship which ended severely and her subsequent choices which led her down a path of confusion and loss. A Delicate Decay is the only part of Fossils partially filmed overseas, as some scenes were filmed in Iceland and France. Gardening, Not Architecture makes a small appearance during the song Hunting in this part of the film.

Of Imprints directed by Jonathan Rogers
Part Two, Of Imprints, consists of only two songs from the album: Interior and Exterior. Rogers wanted Exterior to be a very masculine, external piece filmed entirely outdoors with one main male character. In contrast, Interior is intended to be feminine and internalized and is set entirely indoors revolving around one female character. The male and female character interact between the two songs in Of Imprints, tying both pieces together.

Sarah Saturday and other members of the band make very small cameos as extras in the beginning of Of Imprints.

And What Remains directed by Dycee Wildman
Part Three of Fossils is entitled And What Remains. It is the most traditional narrative of the three parts of the film and tells the story about a couple who slowly drift apart as they become absorbed into each of their life's passions, one person being a botanist and the other being a painter. This part consists of the last three songs on the Fossils album: Let it be Gone, the title song Fossils, and Didn't Know Love. Wildman loosely based And What Remains on her own relationship, she being the artist and her partner a scientist. She also had the pleasure of working with worms for the first time on the set of the film.

Saturday also commissioned local dance troupe Numinous Flux to choreograph and perform a dance interpretation of the album, which streamed one time only on YouTube in 2015.

Fossils Film Live (2016)
The Fossils film premiered online in July 2016. There were two additional screenings of the film in 2016. On June 4, 2016, Saturday and Wildman hosted "Fossils: A 360 Audio/Visual Experience" at abrasiveMedia art gallery in Nashville. The show was a one-night installation of the film's three parts on separate screens, the album playing in wireless headphones, the Clouds painting series by L.A. Bachman that was featured in the film, and the recorded dance performance by Numinous Flux. On November 11–12, 2016, Gardening, Not Architecture performed "Fossils Film Live</ref>" as part of the Modular Art Pods show at Queen Ave Arts Collective in East Nashville.

Film Scoring (2016-2018)
After the release of Fossils, Saturday began focusing on film scoring after having several of Gardening, Not Architecture's songs placed in TV, film, and commercials. Her most notable film scoring credits during this period are the entire original motion picture soundtrack for Superpowerless and several cues for the TV movie "Dark Side of the Sun" on the Discovery Channel. During this time, Saturday took a hiatus from performing live and writing for Gardening, Not Architecture.

Absence of Me (Single) 2019
On April 28, 2019, Gardening, Not Architecture released a new single, produced by Eric Hillman, entitled Absence of Me. It was the first Gardening, Not Architecture release since 2015. A few days after the release, Saturday premiered a music video for the single, directed and edited by Dycee Wildman and Caleb Dirks. On May 18, 2019, Saturday revealed a new solo live performance piece at the single release show for Absence of Me, which took place at The Cobra in East Nashville. The performance piece featured Saturday performing in all white with a homemade lighting backdrop and accompanying video projections created by collaborator Dycee Wildman. The performance was 22 minutes long and included sampled meditation clips, remixed original Gardening, Not Architecture songs, and the premiere of the new single and music video. For the show, Saturday played only a bass and used a laptop for backing tracks, a throwback to the original Gardening, Not Architecture touring setup from 2007–2012.

In popular culture
Gardening, Not Architecture songs have been used in the television shows Parenthood and Jane By Design, indie film Mutual Friends and in online advertisements for Patagonia. Sarah Saturday wrote and produced the original motion picture score for the indie film Superpowerless in 2016, and co-wrote and co-produced music with Eric Hillman for the TV movie Dark Side of the Sun on Discovery Channel in 2017.

Collaborators
 Beau Sorenson – production, programming, sampling, engineering (2004-2009)
 Hunter Burgan – drums (2008)
 Steve Choi – production, engineering (2011)
 Bryan Feece – drums (2012–2016)
 Jackson Parsons – guitar (2013–2016)
 Logan Matheny – production, engineering, mixing (2014–2015)
 Josh Cropper – bass (2015–2016)
 Larry Duren – keyboards (2015–2016)
 Eric Hillman - production, engineering (2017-present)
 Dycee Wildman - videography (2014-present)

Discography
 First EP (2007)
 First LP (2009)
 Saboteur (2011)
 The Florida Sessions (Demos) (2012)
 Fossils (2015)
 Superpowerless (Original Motion Picture Score) (2016)
 Absence of Me (Single) (2019)

References

External links

 Official site

Indie rock musical groups from Tennessee
American electronic music groups
Indie pop groups from Tennessee
American women performance artists
American performance artists